The men's Greco-Roman welterweight competition at the 1956 Summer Olympics in Melbourne took place from 3 December to 6 December at the Royal Exhibition Building. Nations were limited to one competitor.

Competition format

This Greco-Roman wrestling competition continued to use the "bad points" elimination system introduced at the 1928 Summer Olympics for Greco-Roman and at the 1932 Summer Olympics for freestyle wrestling, as modified in 1952 (adding medal rounds and making all losses worth 3 points—from 1936 to 1948 losses by split decision only cost 2). Each round featured all wrestlers pairing off and wrestling one bout (with one wrestler having a bye if there were an odd number). The loser received 3 points. The winner received 1 point if the win was by decision and 0 points if the win was by fall. At the end of each round, any wrestler with at least 5 points was eliminated. This elimination continued until the medal rounds, which began when 3 wrestlers remained. These 3 wrestlers each faced each other in a round-robin medal round (with earlier results counting, if any had wrestled another before); record within the medal round determined medals, with bad points breaking ties.

Results

Round 1

Vargset withdrew after his bout.

 Bouts

 Points

Round 2

Petkov withdrew due to injury at 8:15 into his bout and was unable to continue the competition.

 Bouts

 Points

Round 3

 Bouts

 Points

Medal rounds

The Official Report shows Berlin defeating Maneyev in the medal rounds while Sports-Reference shows the opposite result (Maneyev winning the bout against Berlin). The latter is consistent with the final placings, which have Maneyev as the silver medalist and Berlin the bronze. Bayrak defeated both of the other medalists to earn the gold medal.

 Bouts

 Points

References

Wrestling at the 1956 Summer Olympics